is a Japanese historical fantasy light novel series written by Moto'o Nakanishi and illustrated by Tamaki. It was serialized online between January 2013 and May 2016 on the user-generated novel publishing website Arcadia, and it later moved to the Shōsetsuka ni Narō website, where it was serialized between December 2015 and October 2016. It was later acquired by Futabasha, who have published twelve volumes since June 2019. A manga adaptation with art by Yū Satomi is published by Futabasha since September 2021 and has been collected in three tankōbon volumes. Both the original light novel series and manga adaptation are licensed in English by Seven Seas Entertainment. An anime adaptation has been announced.

Media

Light novels

Manga

Anime
An anime adaptation was announced by Futabasha on September 9, 2021.

Reception
The novel series has over 230,000 copies in circulation.

References

External links
Web novel at Arcadia 
 at Shōsetsuka ni Narō 
 

2019 Japanese novels
Action anime and manga
Anime and manga based on light novels
Futabasha manga
Historical fantasy anime and manga
Japanese fantasy novels
Light novels
Light novels first published online
Seinen manga
Seven Seas Entertainment titles
Shōsetsuka ni Narō
Supernatural anime and manga